These are tables of congressional delegations from North Carolina to the United States House of Representatives and the United States Senate.

The current deans of the North Carolina delegation are Representatives Virginia Foxx (NC-5) and Patrick McHenry (NC-10), who have served in the house since 2005.

U.S. House of Representatives

Current members 
The delegation has 14 members,  7 Republicans and 7 Democrats. In 2022 , per the 2020 United States census, North Carolina gained one new congressional seat.

1789–1793: 5 seats
After North Carolina ratified the United States Constitution, on November 21, 1789, it was apportioned five seats.

1793–1803: 10 seats 
Following the 1790 census, North Carolina was apportioned 10 seats.

1803–1813: 12 seats 
Following the 1800 census, North Carolina was apportioned 12 seats.

1813–1843: 13 seats 
Following the 1810 census, North Carolina was apportioned 13 seats.

1843–1853: 9 seats 
Following the 1840 census, North Carolina was apportioned nine seats.

1853–1863: 8 seats 
Following the 1850 census, North Carolina was apportioned eight seats.

1863–1873: 7 seats 
Following the 1860 census, North Carolina was apportioned seven seats.

1873–1883: 8 seats 
Following the 1870 census, North Carolina was apportioned eight seats.

1883–1903: 9 seats 
Following the 1880 census, North Carolina was apportioned nine seats. At first, the extra seat was elected at-large.

1903–1933: 10 seats 
Following the 1900 census, North Carolina was apportioned 10 seats.

1933–1943: 11 seats 
Following the 1930 census, North Carolina was apportioned 11 seats.

1943–1963: 12 seats 
Following the 1940 census, North Carolina was apportioned 12 seats.

1963–1993: 11 seats 
Following the 1960 census, North Carolina was apportioned 11 seats.

1993–2003: 12 seats 
Following the 1990 census, North Carolina was apportioned 12 seats.

2003–2023: 13 seats 
Following the 2000 census, North Carolina was apportioned 13 seats.

2023–present: 14 seats 
Since the 2020 census, North Carolina has been apportioned 14 seats.

U.S. Senate

Key

See also

 List of United States congressional districts
 North Carolina's congressional districts
 Political party strength in North Carolina

Notes

References 

 
 
North Carolina
Politics of North Carolina
Congressional delegations
congress